Pak Ngau Shek Sheung Tsuen is a village in Lam Tsuen, Tai Po District, Hong Kong.

Administration
Pak Ngau Shek Sheung Tsuen is a recognized village under the New Territories Small House Policy.

History
At the time of the 1911 census, the population of Pak Ngau Shek was 53. The number of males was 22.

See also
 Pak Ngau Shek Ha Tsuen
 Kadoorie Farm and Botanic Garden

References

External links
 Delineation of area of existing village Pak Ngau Shek Sheung Tsuen (Tai Po) for election of resident representative (2019 to 2022)
 Antiquities Advisory Board. Historic Building Appraisal. Leung Ancestral Hall, No. 6 Pak Ngau Shek Sheung Tsuen Pictures

Villages in Tai Po District, Hong Kong
Lam Tsuen